Adam White (born 8 November 1989) is an Australian volleyball player. He competed for Australia at the 2012 Summer Olympics.

Early life
White was born on 8 November 1989 in Everton Park, Queensland, Australia. His nickname is "Beanery". White's hobbies include mixing music and producing music. His primary school was St. Flannan's in Queensland. He went to high school at St. Patrick's College, a private, Roman Catholic day school in Shorncliffe, Brisbane, Queensland.

Volleyball
White currently plays for Active Living Orion (Netherlands). He plays in the wing spiker position. He plays in the zone four (or "Zone 4") volleyball position in the game. He has played on the national team for Australia, Australia men's national volleyball team (coached by Jon Uriarte), for five years. His international volleyball début was in 2007 with the Daejeon Samsung Bluefangs. His career started with the Australian Institute of Sport in 2004. He became captain of the Australian Institute of Sport volleyball team in 2007, and won titles with the team, in every single season, between 2005 and 2008. He first played at senior national level at the 2008 Asian Men's Cup Volleyball Championship. He was part of the Australia men's national volleyball team at the 2010 FIVB Volleyball Men's World Championship in Italy. He has been selected for Australia's national team 118 times.

His recent performances include finishing first at the 2011 International Series, when he played against Thailand. At the 2011 China Volleyball Challenge 1, he finished in second position. At the second challenge of that event, along with his team, he finished in third position. At the Rashid International Volleyball Tournament in Dubai, 2011, he finished in second position. At the 2011 Asian Championships in Tehran, Iran, he finished in fourth position. At the 2012 Volleyball International Series, his team drew with the Netherlands. At the 2012 Olympic Qualification Tournament in Tokyo, Japan, along with his team, White finished in second position.

Clubs
 Langhenkel Orion (2009) NL
 TV Ingersoll Bühl (2012) GER
 BluVolley Verona (2013) ITA
 Tours volleyball (2015–2017) FRA
 Berlin Recycling Volleys (2017–2020) GER
 Active Living Orion (2020–..) NL

References

External links
 
 
 
 

Australian men's volleyball players
Volleyball players at the 2012 Summer Olympics
Olympic volleyball players of Australia
1989 births
Living people
People from Queensland